The 1999 Rugby World Cup Final was the final match in the 1999 Rugby World Cup.

Australia won the game by 35 points to 12, and with it, their second World Cup, having also won the 1991 tournament in England.

Match summary

First half

In front of a capacity crowd of 72,500 at the recently completed Millennium Stadium, Australia met France in the fourth Rugby World Cup Final. For both teams it was their second Final. Australia were resilient in defence throughout the tournament while France promised an attacking back line full of talent. In damp and cold conditions France took an early lead with a Christophe Lamaison penalty after two minutes. Matt Burke equalled the scores after four minutes with a successful kick. The Australian forwards dominated in the loose and their tactic of continually kicking for territory and position proved effective. Lamaison offered some respite by slotting a 12th-minute penalty to give France a 6–3 lead. Injury and the subsequent substitution of Olivier Magne disrupted the France back row line-up after 20 minutes. Matt Burke's kicking was important as time and again French exuberance in the loose was penalised. By half-time the Australians led 12–6 with all points from the two goal kickers.

Second half

As with the first half Burke and Lamaison traded penalty goals. After an hour the contest was still in the balance with the score at 18–12 to Australia. France continued to look lacklustre as the Wallabies began to mount a series of attacks.

A Burke penalty after 64 minutes put Australia more than one score in front, and theoretically clear. With only 15 minutes remaining Ben Tune crashed over for the first try of the contest with Burke again adding the conversion points. The last action of the final was a rolling forward surge and try for Australian second-half substitute Owen Finegan. Inevitably Matt Burke slotted the conversion. Referee André Watson called time on the contest with Australia emphatic winners 35–12.

Again the final was hardly a classic match, though the modern approach of effective defensive lines and an outstanding goal kicking display proved to be rewarded. Australia were rewarded for their efforts with a second World Cup win and captain John Eales accepted the Webb Ellis Cup from Queen Elizabeth.

Match details

References

Final
1999
Sports competitions in Cardiff
1999 in Australian rugby union
1999–2000 in French rugby union
1990s in Cardiff
Australia national rugby union team matches
France national rugby union team matches
History of rugby union matches between Australia and France
November 1999 sports events in the United Kingdom